Angel Hernandez Campos (born August 22, 1973) is an American former umpire in Major League Baseball (MLB). He umpired his first major league game on May 3, 2007.  He was released after the 2014 season.

Umpiring career
Angel Campos began his professional umpiring career in the minor leagues in 2000. He umpired his first MLB game on May 3, 2007.

Incidents and notable games
In May 2011, Campos ejected Kansas City Royals catcher Matt Treanor from a game against the St. Louis Cardinals. Although the two were exchanging words, Treanor was not facing Campos at the time he was thrown out. Royals manager Ned Yost, who was also ejected, was later quoted as saying, "Nobody in the park knew that they were arguing. Nobody. And to eject the guy under those circumstances isn't right."

In August 2012, Campos ejected Los Angeles Dodgers outfielder Matt Kemp, who was in the dugout, in the second inning of a game against the Pittsburgh Pirates. Dodgers players admitted to arguing with Campos concerning the strike zone earlier. After a called strike from Pirates pitcher A. J. Burnett was contested, Campos said that he had had enough but moments later, Kemp yelled to teammate Andre Ethier "let's go, Dre," and was ejected by Campos. Dodger manager Don Mattingly was subsequently ejected by first base umpire Tim Tschida, and Campos ejected Dodger starting pitcher Joe Blanton in the fifth inning.

Campos was the second base umpire when San Francisco Giants pitcher Jonathan Sánchez no-hit the San Diego Padres on July 10, 2009.

Campos was also at second base on June 13, 2012, when Giants pitcher Matt Cain threw a perfect game against the Houston Astros.

Health problem
In September 2010, Campos became ill while a rain delay postponed the start of a regular season game between the Minnesota Twins and Cleveland Indians. He was taken to a Cleveland hospital and underwent an emergency appendectomy.

See also 

 List of Major League Baseball umpires

References 

Major League Baseball umpires
1973 births
Living people
People from Montclair, California